The Red Terror was a campaign of mass arrests and executions conducted by the Bolshevik government of Soviet Russia in 1918–1922.

Red Terror may also refer to:
 Communist terrorism
 Left-wing terrorism
 Cultural Revolution, mass violence by the Red Guards in China from August 1966 to September 1976 
 Revolutionary terror
 The last six weeks of the Reign of Terror of the French Revolution in 1794
 Red Terror (Hungary), a series of atrocities by the Hungarian Soviet Republic in 1919
 Red Terror (Spain), various atrocities by Spanish Republicans during the Spanish Civil War of the 1930s
 Red Terror (Ethiopia), a violent political campaign to annihilate the Ethiopian People's Revolutionary Party in Ethiopia in 1977–1978
 Red Terror (Finland), various brutal acts committed by Red Guards during the Finnish Civil War in 1918
 Leftist errors (Yugoslavia), sometimes called the Red Terror, a period in Yugoslavia (1941–1942) during World War II
 Red Terror (Greece), from approximately 1942 or 1943 until the end of the Greek Civil War in 1949

Other uses 
 NZR RM class (Red Terror), a NZR railcar used by a former general manager Garnet Mackley
 Red Terror or Phar Lap, a champion race horse
 The Red Terror, a figure in the Warhammer 40,000 video game
 The Red Terror (film), the English title for GPU, a German 1942 film directed by Karl Ritter
 The mascot of the sports teams at Glynn Academy High School in Brunswick, Georgia

See also 
 Anti-communist mass killings
 Crimes against humanity under communist regimes
 Mass killings under communist regimes
 Red Scare
 "The Red Wedding"
 Terror (disambiguation)
 White Terror (disambiguation)